Skara Sommarland is a summer park located 8 km east of Skara. It was founded in 1984 by Swedish entrepreneur Bert Karlsson. The park attracts 350,000 visitors annually. During the 1980s, it once attracted circa 800 000 people within one year.

Attractions

Roller coasters

Former attractions

References

External links

 
Diskutera Skara Sommarland med andra

Amusement parks in Sweden
Buildings and structures in Västra Götaland County
Tourist attractions in Västra Götaland County
1984 establishments in Sweden
Amusement parks opened in 1984